Ertan Adatepe (born 1 January 1938) is a Turkish former footballer. He played in the striker position. Ertan made one appearance for the senior Turkey national football team, in a friendly 0-0 tie with Ethiopia.

Ertan is best known for his years at Ankaragücü, and while there was twice the top goal scorer of the Süper Lig.

See also 
 List of Süper Lig top scorers

References

External links
 
 

1938 births
Living people
Footballers from Ankara
Turkish footballers
Turkey international footballers
Turkey youth international footballers
MKE Ankaragücü footballers
Galatasaray S.K. footballers
Türk Telekom G.S.K. footballers
Süper Lig players
Association football forwards